{{DISPLAYTITLE:C3F6O}}
The molecular formula C3F6O (molar mass: 166.02 g/mol, exact mass: 165.9853 u) may refer to:

 Hexafluoroacetone (HFA)
 Hexafluoropropylene oxide (HFPO)